Moerchia obvoluta is a species of sea snail, a marine gastropod mollusk in the family Pyramidellidae, the pyrams and their allies.

References

External links
 Moerchia obvoluta in the Encyclopedia of Life
 Moerchia obvoluta in the World Register of Marine Species

Pyramidellidae
Gastropods described in 1860